Lancaster and Morecambe College is a further education College situated on Torrisholme Road,  between Lancaster and Morecambe, Lancashire, England. The college has been providing the local area with access to further and higher education since it was built in the 1950s although it can trace its mission back to Lancaster Mechanics Institute in 1824.

Facilities
Lancaster & Morecambe College has a wide range of facilities open to the public such as a sports centre, conferencing facilities, hairdressing salon, beauty salon, dog grooming parlour, restaurant, nursery and recording studio.

Apprenticeships
Apprenticeships are aimed at people aged 16–24 and provide students with a chance to gain work experience alongside a national recognised qualification.

History
While the college in its present incarnation has only existed since the 1950s, Lancaster and Morecambe College traces its existence back to the early 19th century. The history of the college begins in 1824, when the Library and Mechanics' Institute was opened in Mary Street, Lancaster. The college moved from various sites before being re-established in 1891 as the Storey Institute, a recently constructed premises complete with purpose-built facilities.

The new premises were built on the site of the Mechanics' Institute of 1824. It was built to a design by Paley, Austin and Paley, and was paid for by Thomas Storey (which is why it became known as the Storey Institute). It was donated to the town in 1893 as a technical and science school, newsroom, library, art school and gallery and venue for musical recitals. In 1904, Thomas' son Herbert gave £10,000 to extend the Institute up Castle Hill.

In 1953, the College was again re-established, this time on its present site. In 1963, the College was officially opened by Prince Philip, Duke of Edinburgh.

Notable Former Students
Lisa Allen Head Chef at Northcote (hotel)
Glen Robinson (water polo) 2012 Olympic Athlete
Mabel Pakenham-Walsh (artist)

Former LMC Football Academy Students 

Garry Hunter
Ryan-Zico Black 
John Hardiker
David Perkins (footballer)
Paul Lloyd (footballer)
Jonathan Smith (footballer, born 1986)
Scott Davies (footballer, born 1987)
Aaron Taylor (footballer)
Niall Cowperthwaite
Joe McGee
Dan Parkinson
Joe Mwasile
Chris Doyle (footballer)
Nathan Bondswell
Jack Kelleher

References

External links
Official website

Buildings and structures in Lancaster, Lancashire
Education in Lancaster
Further education colleges in Lancashire